Frank William Gay (September 11, 1920 – May 21, 2007) was an American executive who oversaw several entities for Howard Hughes. He was chairman of the board of directors of the Hughes Air Corporation. He served as a senior vice president and member of the board of directors for the Hughes Tool Company. He was also president and chief executive officer of Summa Corporation.

Background
Born in Salt Lake City, Utah, he was a student at University of California, Los Angeles when he was hired by Hughes. He was responsible for the creation of Hughes Dynamics, a short-lived computer services subsidiary of Hughes Tool in the early 1960s.  A member of the Church of Jesus Christ of Latter-day Saints, Gay put together the so-called "Mormon Mafia" that comprised Hughes's inner circle in his later life. Appointed by the Delaware Court of Chancery, Gay served as trustee of the Howard Hughes Medical Institute from 1984 until his retirement in 2006. He had previously served on the Institute's executive committee from 1971 to 1984.

He was an active supporter of the Boy Scouts of America.

His son is Robert C. Gay, a co-founder and CEO of Huntsman Gay Global Capital, and before that managing director of Bain Capital for sixteen years.

Gay died in Kingwood, Texas in 2007.

References

External links
In Memoriam: Frank William Gay via Howard Hughes Medical Institute

1920 births
2007 deaths
Businesspeople from Salt Lake City
University of California, Los Angeles alumni
Latter Day Saints from Utah
20th-century American businesspeople
Latter Day Saints from California